Bhai Himmat Singh (1661–1705) was one of the Panj Pyare, or the Five Beloved in Sikhism. He was born in 1661 at town Puri in modern-day Odisha, India. He died in the Battle of Chamkaur on 22 December 1705.

References 

Chhibbar, Kesar Singh, Bansavallnamd Dasdn Pdlshdhidn Kd. Chandigarh, 1972
Knir Singh, Cur/nlds Pdtshdfu 10. Chandigarh, 1968
Santokh Singh, Bhai, Sn Gur Pratap Suraj Granth. Amritsai, 1927–33

Sikh martyrs
Sikh warriors
1661 births
1705 deaths
People from Odisha